The Jackdaw is a British arts magazine, published since 2000 in London, United Kingdom.

History and profile
The Jackdaw was founded by art critic David Lee in 2000. He is also the editor of the magazine, which is critical of the art world, and publishes articles that are both informative and polemical. The magazine has its headquarters in London.

References

External links
 

2000 establishments in the United Kingdom
Bi-monthly magazines published in the United Kingdom
Magazines established in 2000
Magazines published in London
Visual arts magazines published in the United Kingdom